Emmanuel Kojo Dadson (1953 – 9 February 2021) was a veteran Ghanaian actor, director, producer and musician. He is well known for featuring in and directing movies and series like Home Sweet Home, Sun City and Run Baby Run. He gained prominence for his humor and comedic style of acting. He suffered a stroke whilst acting in 2012. He died on the 9 February 2021, aged 68.

Career 
Kojo Dadson was an actor who featured in a number of productions such as Love Brewed In An African Pot, Run Baby Run, Home Sweet Home, Sun City, Hotel St. James, Doctor Love, Location Africa, among others.

In 2012, he suffered a stroke while acting on the set.  The stroke affected his speech and confined him to a wheelchair. He also became a musician in the days when he couldn't move around much.

Honours and recognition 
Dadson was honoured at the Ghana Actors and Entertainers Awards (GAEA) with a Legendary award along with other six veteran actors including Grace Omaboe and given plaques, citations and an undisclosed amount of money for their service to the Movie and entertainment industry in Ghana.

Death
Dadson died on 9 February 2021 at the Korle-Bu Teaching Hospital whilst receiving dialysis treatment for kidney problems, two weeks after his wife had also died. His death caused an outpouring of tributes and messages from the Ghanaian media, West African media and his fellow actors and actresses.

See also 
 Rama Brew
 Home Sweet Home

References

External links 

Ghanaian actors
1953 births
2021 deaths
Ghanaian male actors
People from Western Region (Ghana)